The 1997–98 Butler Bulldogs men's basketball team represented Butler University in the 1997–98 NCAA Division I men's basketball season. Their head coach was Barry Collier, serving in his 9th season at the school. The Bulldogs played their home games at Hinkle Fieldhouse as members of the Midwestern Collegiate Conference. Butler finished third in the MCC regular season standings and won the MCC tournament to receive the conference's automatic bid to the NCAA tournament – the school's second of three NCAA Tournament appearance in a four period under Collier. As No. 13 seed in the Southeast region, the Bulldogs were beaten by No. 4 seed Cincinnati, 79–62 to finish the season with a record of 22–11 (8–6 MCC).

Roster

Schedule and results

|-
!colspan=9 style=| Regular season

|-
!colspan=9 style=| MCC tournament

|-
!colspan=9 style=| NCAA tournament

References

Butler
Butler Bulldogs men's basketball seasons
Butler
Butler Bulldogs men's basketball
Butler Bulldogs men's basketball